Kelasmadin-e Do (also Romanized as Kelāsmadīn-e Do) is a village in Rud Zard Rural District, in the Central District of Bagh-e Malek County, Khuzestan Province, Iran. At the 2006 census, its population was 58, in 14 families.

References 

Populated places in Bagh-e Malek County